

Codes 

</onlyinclude>

References

L